Events from the year 1999 in Russia.

Incumbents
President: Boris Yeltsin (until 31 December), Vladimir Putin (from 31 December, acting President)
Prime Minister: 
 until 12 May: Yevgeny Maximovich Primakov 
 12 May-9 August: Sergei Stepashin
 starting 9 August: Vladimir Putin
Minister of Defence: Igor Sergeyev

Events

March
19 March - 1999 Vladikavkaz bombing

June
June - Exercise Zapad-99

August
August - Invasion of Dagestan

September
September - Russian apartment bombings

October
7 October - Elistanzhi cluster bomb attack
21 October - Grozny ballistic missile attack
29 October - Baku–Rostov highway bombing

December
December - Alkhan-Yurt massacre
3 December - 1999 Grozny refugee convoy shooting
19 December - 1999 Russian legislative election

Undated
Arbat-Opera, a chamber musical theatre–enterprise, is created in Moscow.

Births
1 June - Dmitri Aliev, figure skater
17 June - Elena Rybakina, Kazakhstani tennis player

Deaths
12 June - Sergey Khlebnikov, Olympic speed skater (b. 1955)
3 July - Igor Belsky, ballet dancer (b. 1925)
28 July - Georgy Rerberg, cinematographer (b. 1937)
7 October - Genrikh Sapgir, writer (b. 1928)
21 December - Sergey Nagovitsyn, singer (b. 1968)

References

External links

 
1990s in Russia
Years of the 20th century in Russia
Russia
Russia
Russia